The 2022–23 Oklahoma City Thunder season is the 15th season of the franchise in Oklahoma City and the 57th in the National Basketball Association (NBA).

Previous season
The Thunder finished the 2021–22 season 24–58 to finish in fifth place in the Northwest Division, fourteenth in the Western Conference and failed to qualify for the playoffs. This marks the second consecutive season that the Thunder failed to qualify for the playoffs since moving to Oklahoma City. 

In their second year of the rebuild, the Thunder started the season with 10 players aged 23 years or under. Throughout the season, the Thunder had numerous injuries to Shai Gilgeous-Alexander, Luguentz Dort, Josh Giddey, and Kenrich Williams. Playing without Gilgeous-Alexander, Giddey, and Williams, the Thunder were defeated by an NBA record 73-points in a 152-79 loss against the Memphis Grizzlies on December 2, 2021.

In his rookie season, Josh Giddey - the 6th pick in the 2021 NBA Draft - recorded four triple-doubles including becoming the youngest ever to record one at 19 years and 84 days old. Before his season ending injury, Giddey had won four consecutive Western Conference Rookie of the Month and ultimately finished on the NBA All-Rookie Second Team.

The Thunder ended the 2021-22 season injury-riddled with nine players out in the final games. Utilizing their G League affiliate in the Oklahoma City Blue, the Thunder signed Melvin Frazier Jr., Jaylen Hoard, Georgios Kalaitzakis, and Zavier Simpson to finish out the season.

Offseason

Draft picks

The Thunder had three first-round picks and one second-round pick entering the draft. The Thunder owned two first-round picks entering the 2022 NBA draft lottery. Their sole first-round pick had a 12.50% chance to win the first overall pick while the pick originally acquired from the LA Clippers had a 1.50% chance to win the first pick, acquired through the Paul George trade in 2019. With a combined 14.0% chance to win the first overall pick, the Thunder ended the night with the second overall pick, via their sole first-round pick, and the twelfth overall pick, via the Clippers. The Thunder's other first-round pick ended up as the thirtieth pick originally acquired from the Phoenix Suns as a result of the Chris Paul trade in 2020.

On draft night, the Thunder traded three protected 2023 first-round draft picks to the New York Knicks in exchange for the draft rights to Ousmane Dieng, the eleventh pick. With the thirtieth pick, the Thunder selected and traded the draft rights to Peyton Watson to the Denver Nuggets in the JaMychal Green trade.

The Thunder ended 2022 NBA Draft night with Gonzaga forward Chet Holmgren, Australia's NBL forward Ousmane Dieng, Santa Clara guard Jalen Williams, and Arkansas forward Jaylin Williams.

Trades

On June 23, the Thunder traded the draft rights to Peyton Watson, the thirtieth pick, and two future second-round draft picks to the Denver Nuggets in exchange for JaMychal Green and a future 2027 first-round pick. On July 20, the Thunder negotiated a contract buyout and waived Green. In return, Green gave up $2.6 million in his buyout.

On September 27, the Thunder traded Vít Krejčí to the Atlanta Hawks in exchange for Maurice Harkless and draft considerations in an effort to clear a roster spot. The Thunder received a 2029 second-round pick and amendments on the conditions of a previously traded 2025 second-round pick which will be now top-40 protected.

On September 30, the Thunder traded Derrick Favors, Maurice Harkless, Ty Jerome, Théo Maledon, a 2026 second-round pick and cash considerations to the Houston Rockets in exchange for Sterling Brown, Trey Burke, Marquese Chriss and David Nwaba. Jerome did not report to training camp after a mutual agreement with the Thunder and Jerome's representatives. With the trade, the Thunder generated two trade exceptions and dropped approximately $10 million under the luxury tax. On October 2, the Thunder waived Sterling Brown after acquiring him two days ago. On October 17, the Thunder waived Trey Burke, Marquese Chriss, and David Nwaba to finalize the regular season roster.

Free agency

For this offseason, free agency began on June 30th, 2022, at 6:00 P.M. EST. Derrick Favors, Mike Muscala, Luguentz Dort, Isaiah Roby had upcoming player and team options. In addition, Theo Maledon, Vit Krejci, Aaron Wiggins, and Kenrich Williams held non-guaranteed contracts with the team heading into next season. Melvin Frazier Jr. also held a two-way contract that expired this season. On May 17, Derrick Favors exercised his player option for $10.2 million. On June 29, the Thunder declined Mike Muscala's team option for $3.5 million and exercised Isaiah Roby's team option for $1.9 million. However, on July 3, the Thunder waived Roby as his salary would have become fully guaranteed after exercising his team option. On June 30, it was reported that Luguentz Dort agreed to a five-year, $87.5 million deal to stay with the Thunder, which he later signed on July 6. Dort and the Thunder negotiated the new deal after his team option for $1.9 million was declined. On July 18, it was reported that Kenrich Williams signed a multi-year contract extension worth four-year, $27.2 million, which he later signed on July 20. On August 4, the Thunder re-signed Mike Muscala to a two-year, $7 million deal after his team option was declined on June 30. On October 26, it was announced that Melvin Frazier Jr. joined the Raptors 905 for the upcoming season.

On July 2, Eugene Omoruyi signed a two-way contract with the Thunder, splitting time with the Thunder and Oklahoma City Blue. Omoruyi spent part of the 2021-22 NBA season on a previous two-way contract with the Dallas Mavericks. On October 16, Isaiah Joe signed a contract with the Thunder after being waived by the Philadelphia 76ers.

Front office and coaching changes
On July 27, the Thunder hired Chip Engelland, formerly with the San Antonio Spurs, as an assistant coach. Engelland is considered one of the NBA's preeminent shooting coach and has been one of the league's highest-paid assistant coaches. Sam Presti and Engelland previously worked together with the Spurs organization in the mid-2000s. On July 27, the Thunder hired Vince Rozman, formerly with the Philadelphia 76ers in scouting as VP of Identification and Intelligence. Rozman spent over 15-plus years with the 76ers.

On September 23, the Thunder announced Grant Gibbs will join the Thunder coaching staff after serving as head coach of the Oklahoma City Blue for the past three seasons. In addition, Thunder assistant Kameron Woods was named the new head coach of the Blue. Woods previously played for the Blue for two seasons and served as the head coach of the Thunder during the 2022 NBA Summer League.

Season synopsis

Preseason
The Thunder announced their preseason schedule on August 25. The Thunder played six games, with three games in Oklahoma, two games against international opponents. That same day, the Thunder announced Chet Holmgren will miss the entire season after sustaining a fracture in his right foot during a Pro-Am event. The Thunder opened their preseason opener against the Denver Nuggets on October 3. Tre Mann led the Thunder with 17 points while Aaron Wiggins scored 15 points on a perfect 4-4 from three off the bench in a 112-101 win. Against the Adelaide 36ers on October 6, the Thunder led by as many as 40 points as Mann and Lindy Waters III combined for 14 threes in a 131-98 rout. The Thunder topped their performance against the 36ers with a 144-97 victory over Maccabi Ra'anana leading by as many as 51 points. Eight Thunder players scored in double digits led by Eugene Omoruyi's 25 points. The Thunder ended preseason with a 5-1 record with their single loss against the Dallas Mavericks.

Regular season

October

The Thunder began their 15th season since the franchise moved to Oklahoma City against the Minnesota Timberwolves on October 19. Shai Gilgeous-Alexander, who missed all of preseason, led the Thunder with 32 points. The Thunder trailed by as many as 16-points until a late rally turned into a six-point lead for the Thunder. However the Thunder could not keep the lead, losing 108-115 in their season opener. Rookie guard Jalen Williams took a hit defending a dunk attempt by Jaden McDaniels and left the game, ending his rookie debut with five points in five minutes. The Thunder again faced the Timberwolves for the home opener on October 23. The Thunder never led and trailed by as many as 22-points falling to 0-3 on the season in a 106-116 loss.

In a back-to-back against the LA Clippers, on October 25, Gilgeous-Alexander and Tre Mann led the Thunder to their first win of the season with 33 points and 25 points respectively. In the second game on October 27, the Thunder led by as many as 18 points to a 118-110 win against the Clippers for their second win of the season. Back on the road, on October 29 against the Dallas Mavericks, the Thunder erased an eight-point deficit in the final two minutes of regulation in a 117-111 overtime victory. OKC trailed by as many as 16-points headed into the fourth quarter until the Thunder came back behind Gilgeous-Alexander and Isaiah Joe. Joe, a late signing after being waived by the 76ers, started the fourth quarter comeback by hitting a pair of free throws and a jumper to cut the lead to six. After two Gilgeous-Alexander jumpers, Joe hit a three-pointer to send the game into overtime with 15.8 seconds left in the fourth. Joe later scored 8 of his 15 points in the overtime period giving the Thunder a 117-111 win and their first road victory. On October 31, Gilgeous-Alexander was named the NBA Player of the Week for Week 2 after averaging 31.7 points, 5.3 rebounds, and 7.7 assists.

November
After being named NBA Player of the Week, Gilgeous-Alexander scored 34 points to lead the Thunder after being down 15 points in the second half to a 116-108 win against the Orlando Magic. With a 4-3 record, the Thunder had a winning record for the first time since nine games into the 2020-21 season. In a double overtime thriller on November 9, Gilgeous-Alexander scored 39 points including a step-back three-pointer with 0.6 seconds left in the first overtime giving the Thunder a 126-125 lead. However, Luguentz Dort fouled Brook Lopez on an inbounds lob where Lopez made 1-of-2 free throws. The Thunder ended up losing 132-136 extending their losing streak to four games. Coming off a double overtime game, on November 11, two-way contract player Eugene Omoruyi scored a career-high 22 points to defeat the Toronto Raptors 132-113 after leading by as much as 32 points. Against the New York Knicks on November 12, Gilgeous-Alexander scored 37 points, Josh Giddey recorded 24 points, 10 rebounds, and 12 assists as the Thunder shot a season-high 62.5% in a 145-135 win. Giddey joined Wilt Chamberlain as the only player in NBA history to record triple-doubles in their first two appearances at Madison Square Garden. On November 16, trailing by as much as 17, Gilgeous-Alexander scored 30 in the second half as he matched his career high with 42 points with a step-back three-pointer with 1.1 seconds left as the Thunder defeated the Washington Wizards 121-120. In their third meeting with the Denver Nuggets, the Thunder rallied from a 19-point deficit to take a 15-point lead in the second half before falling 126-131 in overtime. Isaiah Joe almost played heroics again with a career-high 21 points with 7 threes, including a late three in overtime after a jump ball scramble. With Gilgeous-Alexander sidelined with a bruised hip, rookie Jalen Williams scored a career-high 27 points rallying the Thunder from a 20-point second half deficit to win 119-111 against the San Antonio Spurs on November 30. The next day, Williams was named NBA Rookie of the Month for October/November after averaging 10.7 points on 52.4% shooting, 3.2 rebounds, and 2.6 assists. Williams became the third Thunder rookie to win Rookie of the Month honors after Russell Westbrook and Josh Giddey.

December
The Thunder started their longest road trip of the season against the Minnesota Timberwolves on December 3. On their second game of the road trip against the Atlanta Hawks, the Thunder overcame a 14-point deficit in the third to win 121-114. This was the Thunder's first win in Atlanta since the 2017-18 season. Trips to Memphis, Cleveland and Dallas saw the Thunder finish the road trip 2-3 with narrow losses to the Cavaliers and Mavericks. Back at Paycom Center, the Thunder then started their longest home stand with seven straight games. Playing without Shai Gilgeous-Alexander and Josh Giddey, the Thunder lead by as many as 24-points against the top-seeded Memphis Grizzlies on December 17 with Luguentz Dort's 24 points Isaiah Joe's career-high 23 points in a 115-109 win. In the first back-to-back against the Portland Trail Blazers, Gilgeous-Alexander hit a game winner at the buzzer over Justise Winslow to finish with 35 points on December 19. Coming off back-to-back wins against the Trail Blazers, Gilgeous-Alexander scored a career-high 44 points to go with 10 rebounds and six assists in an overtime loss to the New Orleans Pelicans. Gilgeous-Alexander nearly sent the game into double overtime after a missed free throw rebound caromed toward halfcourt. During a 130-114 win against the San Antonio Spurs, Giddey became the second-youngest NBA player to reach 1,000 points, 500 rebounds and 500 assists, behind only LeBron James. The Thunder bench also scored a season-high 68 points marking the second most bench points in Thunder history.

January
Playing without Shai Gilgeous-Alexander, the Thunder scored a season-high 150 points in a 150-117 win over the then-best record Boston Celtics on January 3. The Thunder's 150 points and 48 in the third quarter were franchise highs as well as seven Thunder players scoring in double-figures led by Josh Giddey with 25 points, five rebounds and five assists in 24 minutes. On January 10 against the Miami Heat, the Thunder played on national TV - excluding NBA TV - for the first time since the 2020 NBA Playoffs on TNT. The Heat, led by Jimmy Butler, set an NBA record making all 40 free throws in a 112-111 win over the Thunder. Against the 76ers, the Thunder snapped their six game road losing streak after leading by as much as 21 to a 133-114 win. Gilgeous-Alexander had 37 points including a career-perfect 16-16 from the free throw line. Rookie Jaylin Williams also contributed with a career-high 11 points in his fourth start of his career. In their third game in four nights, the Thunder swept the season series against the Chicago Bulls behind Giddey's season-high 25 points. Rookie Jalen Williams also added 22 points on an efficient 10-12 shooting. To finish the four game road trip, Giddey tied his career-high 28 points along with 9 rebounds and 9 assists in a 112-102 win against the Brooklyn Nets. Returning back home, the Thunder recorded a franchise-high 41 assists in a 126-106 rout against the Indiana Pacers on January 18. Against the then-best record in the west Denver Nuggets, Gilgeous-Alexander banked in the decisive game-winner with 9.2 seconds left in a 101-99 win. On January 31, Josh Giddey and Jalen Williams were named to the 2023 Rising Stars Challenge. In 45 games, Giddey averaged 16.1 points, 8.0 rebounds and 5.7 assists. Giddey's assists ranked second among sophomores. In 46 games, Williams averaged 12.1 points, 3.9 rebounds, 2.8 assists and 1.7 steals. Giddey and Williams became the 12th and 13th players in Thunder history to be named to a Rising Stars team.

February
On February 2, Shai Gilgeous-Alexander was named a 2023 NBA All-Star reserve for the first time. In 47 games, Gilgeous-Alexander averaged 30.8 points, 4.8 rebounds, 5.6 assists, 1.6 steals and 1.1 blocks, leading the Thunder to a 24-27 record. Gilgeous-Alexander scored 30-plus points in 30 games this season, ranking second this season. He leads the league with 434 made free throws and sixth in the league with 101 points scored in clutch time. Gilgeous-Alexander joins Kevin Durant, Russell Westbrook, Paul George, and Chris Paul as the fifth Thunder player to be named an All-Star since the franchise moved to Oklahoma City. In his first game after being named an All-Star, Gilgeous-Alexander scored a career-high 20 first quarter points in a 153-121 rout against the Houston Rockets. The Thunder set a new franchise record 153 points after previously setting an Oklahoma City-high 150 points. The Thunder ended with six players in double-figures scoring led by Gilgeous-Alexander's 42 points. On February 7, the Thunder had their second national TV game on TNT against the Los Angeles Lakers. LeBron James passed Kareem Abdul-Jabbar as the all-time scoring leader on a fadeaway shot against Kenrich Williams. Despite James' record breaking night, the Thunder won 133-130 behind Shai Gilgeous-Alexander's 30 points and Jalen Williams's 25 points.

At the NBA trade deadline, the Thunder completed two trades with the Boston Celtics and the Phoenix Suns. The Thunder traded Mike Muscala to the Boston Celtics in exchange for Justin Jackson and two second-round picks. Muscala, who re-signed with the Thunder this offseason, averaged 6.2 points on 39.4% three-point shooting in 43 games. Jackson, who played for the Thunder during the 2020-21 season, was waived following the trade. Muscala's departure allowed the Thunder to prioritize more playing time for Jeremiah Robinson-Earl, Jaylin Williams and Ousmane Dieng, in addition to Chet Holmgren next season. The Thunder also traded Darius Bazley to the Phoenix Suns in exchange for Dario Šarić, a second-round pick, and cash considerations. Bazley's role decreased with the Thunder this year after averaging 10.8 points in the 2021-22 season to 5.4 points in 36 games this season. Šarić joins the Thunder after recovering from a torn ACL and missing the entire 2021-22 season averaging 5.8 points and 3.8 rebounds this season. After waiving Justin Jackson, the Thunder converted Eugene Omoruyi's two-way contract to a standard contract extending through the 2023-24 season. Omoruyi became the fifth Thunder player to have their two-way converted into a standard contract, joining Deonte Burton, Luguentz Dort, Moses Brown, and Aaron Wiggins. To fill in the open two-way slot, the Thunder signed Olivier Sarr who spent part of the 2021-22 season with the Thunder. Sarr rejoined the Oklahoma City Blue in January after being waived by the Portland Trail Blazers.

On February 10, Shai Gilgeous-Alexander tied his career high with 44 points in a 138-129 win over the Portland Trail Blazers. Gilgeous-Alexander shot 81% from field along with 18 of 19 from the free throw line becoming the first player in franchise history to record 40+ points on 80% or better from the field. Gilgeous-Alexander was later named the NBA Player of the Week for Week 17 - his second - after averaging 31.3 points, 6.3 assists on 57.1% shooting. At the 2023 NBA All-Star Jordan Rising Stars Challenge, Josh Giddey and Jalen Williams were both selected for Team Joakim. Against Team Jason, Giddey had a team high 6 assists while Williams had a team high 5 rebounds in a 40-32 win. In the championship final, Team Joakim lost 20-25 to Team Pau. At 2023 NBA All-Star Game, Shai Gilgeous-Alexander was selected fifth overall in the reserves to Team Giannis. In his first All-Star game, Gilgeous-Alexander had 9 points and 7 assists in 10 minutes as Team Giannis defeated Team LeBron 184-175.

Without Shai Gilgeous-Alexander, Isaiah Joe started and scored a career-high 28 points on 6-12 three-point shooting in a 115-124 loss to the Phoenix Suns on February 24. On February 26, the Thunder waived Eugene Omoruyi sixteen days after re-signing to a multi-year contract. Omoruyi started off on a two-way contract before re-signing to a standard contract following the departures of Darius Bazley and Mike Muscala. Omoruyi appeared in 21 games averaging 5.0 points and 2.3 rebounds in 12.2 minutes. The Thunder opted for a free roster spot and decided between waiving Omoruyi or Dario Šarić. By converting Omoruyi's contract into a standard, the Thunder gave Omoruyi a pay bump prior to inevitably being waived. To fill in the open roster spot, the Thunder converted Lindy Waters III's two-way contract to a standard contract. Waters III became the sixth Thunder player to have their two-way contract converted into a standard contract.

March
On March 2, the Thunder announced Kenrich Williams will miss the rest of the season after sustaining a scapholunate ligament rupture in his left wrist after a 117-123 loss to the Sacramento Kings. In his third season with the Thunder, Williams appeared in 53 games averaging 8.0 points on 51.7% from the field, 4.9 rebounds and 2.0 assists in 22.8 minutes. Williams also led the league during that time with 26 charges drawn. After Lindy Waters III's two-way contract was converted into a standard contract, the Thunder signed Jared Butler to a two-way contract. Butler spent the beginning of the season with the Grand Rapids Gold in the NBA G League averaging 18.0 points and 5.7 assists in 41 games after being waived by the Utah Jazz prior to the season. Against the Utah Jazz, the Thunder had their eighth game this season with three players scoring more than 20 points. Coming back from injury, Shai Gilgeous-Alexander scored 38 points, Jalen Williams had a career high 32 points on 12-15 shooting, and Josh Giddey had 24 points, 9 rebounds, and 9 assists in a 129-119 win. Against the Golden State Warriors on March 7, the Thunder snapped their eight game losing streak to Golden State. Seven Thunder players scored in double-figures led by Shai Gilgeous-Alexander's 33 points. Additionally, Josh Giddey recorded his seventh career triple-double with 17 points, 11 rebounds and a career high 17 assists and Jaylin Williams scored a career high 15 points. On March 19, the Thunder came back down 15 against the Phoenix Suns to win 124-120. After not playing the entire game, Aaron Wiggins lead an 18-2 run in the fourth quarter with 7 points and 2 steals while playing the whole quarter. Gilgeous-Alexander led the Thunder with 40 points while Luguentz Dort had 11 of his 20 points in the third quarter.

Roster

Roster notes
Darius Bazley changed his jersey number to #55 while Chet Holmgren chose Bazley's former jersey number #7.
Chet Holmgren sustained a Lisfranc injury in his right foot and will miss the 2022-23 NBA season. Holmgren sustained the injury in the CrawsOver Pro-Am event while defending LeBron James on a fast break. The Thunder received an insurance reimbursement of 80% on Holmgren's per-game salary as a result of him missing 41 games.
Eugene Omoruyi became the first player in Thunder history to wear jersey number #97, second in league history.

Salaries

Source: Spotrac

Staff

Standings

Conference

Division

Game log

Preseason

|-  style="background:#cfc;"
| 1
| October 3
| @ Denver  
| 
| Tre Mann (17)
| Josh Giddey (12)
| Josh Giddey (9)
| Ball Arena12,432
| 1–0
|-  style="background:#fcc;"
| 2
| October 5
| Dallas
|  
| Josh Giddey (13)
| K. Williams, Bazley (6)
| Giddey, Jal. Williams (3)
| BOK Center
| 1–1
|-  style="background:#cfc;"
| 3
| October 6
| Adelaide 
| 
| Tre Mann (26)
| Jaylin Williams (12)
| Giddey, Jay. Williams (6)
| Paycom Center
| 2–1
|-  style="background:#cfc;"
| 4
| October 9
| Maccabi Ra'anana
| 
| Eugene Omoruyi (25)
| Omoruyi, Jay. Williams (12)
| Jalen Williams (13)
| Paycom Center
| 3–1
|-  style="background:#cfc;"
| 5
| October 11
| @ Detroit 
|  
| Dort, Jal. Williams, Giddey (16)
| Darius Bazley (8)
| Josh Giddey (9)
| Little Caesars Arena8,723
| 4–1
|-  style="background:#cfc;"
| 6
| October 13
| @ San Antonio
| 
| Jalen Williams (21)
| Jaylin Williams (11)
| Giddey, Mann (6)
| AT&T Center13,836
| 5–1

Regular season

|-  style="background:#fcc;"
| 1
| October 19
| @ Minnesota
| 
| Shai Gilgeous-Alexander (32)
| Josh Giddey (11)
| Shai Gilgeous-Alexander (5)
| Target Center17,136
| 0–1
|-  style="background:#fcc;"
| 2
| October 22
| @ Denver
| 
| Shai Gilgeous-Alexander (28)
| Josh Giddey (12)
|Shai Gilgeous-Alexander (7)
| Ball Arena19,983
| 0–2
|-  style="background:#fcc;"
| 3
| October 23
|  Minnesota
| 
| Luguentz Dort (20)
| Mike Muscala (9)
| Josh Giddey (5)
| Paycom Center15,044
| 0–3
|-  style="background:#cfc;"
| 4
| October 25
| L.A. Clippers
|  
| Shai Gilgeous-Alexander (33)
| Muscala, Wiggins (10)
| Shai Gilgeous-Alexander (8)
| Paycom Center13,105
| 1–3
|-  style="background:#cfc;"
| 5
| October 27
| L.A. Clippers
|  
| Shai Gilgeous-Alexander (24)
| Darius Bazley (9)
| Shai Gilgeous-Alexander (6)
| Paycom Center14,510
| 2–3
|- style="background:#cfc;"
| 6
| October 29
| @ Dallas
| 
| Shai Gilgeous-Alexander (38)
| Darius Bazley (8)
| Shai Gilgeous-Alexander (9)
| American Airlines Center20,307
| 3–3

|- style="background:#cfc;"
| 7
| November 1
| Orlando
| 
| Shai Gilgeous-Alexander (34)
| Aleksej Pokuševski (9)
| Josh Giddey (10)
| Paycom Center13,109
| 4–3
|-  style="background:#fcc;"
| 8
| November 3
| Denver
| 
| Shai Gilgeous-Alexander (37)
| Pokuševski, Robinson-Earl (7)
| Josh Giddey (5)
| Paycom Center13,791
| 4–4
|- style="background:#fcc;"
| 9
| November 5 
| @ Milwaukee
| 
| Shai Gilgeous-Alexander (18)
| Josh Giddey (6)
| Luguentz Dort (7)
| Fiserv Forum17,713
| 4–5
|- style="background:#fcc;"
| 10
| November 7
| @ Detroit
| 
| Shai Gilgeous-Alexander (33)
| Kenrich Williams (8)
| Shai Gilgeous-Alexander (5)
| Little Caesars Arena16,223
| 4–6
|-  style="background:#fcc;"
| 11
| November 9
|Milwaukee
| 
| Shai Gilgeous-Alexander (39)
| Josh Giddey (15)
| Josh Giddey (6)
| Paycom Center15,180
| 4–7
|-  style="background:#cfc;"
| 12
| November 11
| Toronto 
| 
| Eugene Omoruyi (22)
| Josh Giddey (9)
| Jalen Williams (11)
| Paycom Center16,104
| 5–7
|-  style="background:#cfc;"
| 13
| November 13
| @ New York
| 
| Shai Gilgeous-Alexander (37)
| Josh Giddey (10)
| Josh Giddey (12)
| Madison Square Garden18,325
| 6–7
|-  style="background:#fcc;"
| 14
| November 14
| @ Boston
| 
| Shai Gilgeous-Alexander (37)
| Aleksej Pokuševski (14)
| Shai Gilgeous-Alexander (8)
| TD Garden19,156
| 6–8
|-  style="background:#cfc;"
| 15
| November 16 
| @ Washington
| 
| Shai Gilgeous-Alexander (42)
| Giddey, Gilgeous-Alexander (6)
| Shai Gilgeous-Alexander (7)
| Capital One Arena12,630
| 7–8
|-  style="background:#fcc;"
| 16
| November 18
| @ Memphis
|  
| Josh Giddey (20)
| Dort, Robinson-Earl (7)
| Josh Giddey (11)
| FedEx Forum17,324
| 7–9
|-  style="background:#fcc;"
| 17
| November 21
| New York
|  
| Shai Gilgeous-Alexander (30)
| Josh Giddey (9)
| Giddey, Gilgeous-Alexander (7)
| Paycom Center15,079
| 7–10
|-  style="background:#fcc;"
| 18
| November 23
| Denver
| 
| Shai Gilgeous-Alexander (31)
| Jeremiah Robinson-Earl (11)
| Shai Gilgeous-Alexander (11)
| Paycom Center13,656
| 7–11
|-  style="background:#cfc;"
| 19
| November 25
| Chicago
| 
| Shai Gilgeous-Alexander (30)
| Josh Giddey (13)
| Josh Giddey (9)
| Paycom Center16,082
| 8–11
|-  style="background:#fcc;"
| 20
| November 26 
| @ Houston
|  
| Shai Gilgeous-Alexander (32)
| Giddey, Mann, Robinson-Earl, Jal. Williams (5)
| Jalen Williams (4)
| Toyota Center15,151
| 8–12
|-  style="background:#fcc;"
| 21
| November 28
| @ New Orleans
|  
| Shai Gilgeous-Alexander (31)
| Jeremiah Robinson-Earl (13)
| Luguentz Dort (5)
| Smoothie King Center13,109
| 8–13
|-  style="background:#cfc;"
| 22
| November 30
| San Antonio
|  
| Jalen Williams (27)
| Josh Giddey (14)
| Josh Giddey (5)
| Paycom Center15,605
| 9–13

|-  style="background:#cfc;"
| 23
| December 3
| @ Minnesota
|  
| Shai Gilgeous-Alexander (33)
| Josh Giddey (12)
| Josh Giddey (7)
| Target Center17,136
| 10–13
|-  style="background:#cfc;"
| 24
| December 5
| @ Atlanta
|  
| Shai Gilgeous-Alexander (35)
| Luguentz Dort (10)
| Shai Gilgeous-Alexander (5)
| State Farm Arena16,301
| 11–13
|-  style="background:#fcc;"
| 25
| December 7
| @ Memphis
| 
| Shai Gilgeous-Alexander (26)
| Josh Giddey (10)
| Shai Gilgeous-Alexander (7)
| FedExForum15,942
| 11–14
|-  style="background:#fcc;"
| 26
| December 10
| @ Cleveland 
| 
| Shai Gilgeous-Alexander (23)
| Aleksej Pokuševski (14)
| Josh Giddey (6)
| Rocket Mortgage FieldHouse19,432
| 11–15
|-  style="background:#fcc;"
| 27
| December 12
| @ Dallas
| 
| Shai Gilgeous-Alexander (42)
| Aleksej Pokuševski (9)
| Giddey, Jal. Williams (4)
| American Airlines Center19,877
| 11–16
|-  style="background:#fcc;"
| 28
| December 14
| Miami 
| 
| Shai Gilgeous-Alexander (27)
| Josh Giddey (11)
| Giddey, Gilgeous-Alexander (7)
| Paycom Center14,783
| 11–17
|-  style="background:#fcc;"
| 29
| December 16 
| Minnesota
| 
| Shai Gilgeous-Alexander (35)
| Josh Giddey (13)
| Josh Giddey (6)
| Paycom Center14,885
| 11–18
|-  style="background:#cfc;"
| 30
| December 17
| Memphis
| 
| Luguentz Dort (24)
| Kenrich Williams (8)
| Jalen Williams (6)
| Paycom Center16,895
| 12–18
|-  style="background:#cfc;"
| 31
| December 19
| Portland 
| 
| Shai Gilgeous-Alexander (35)
| Jalen Williams (7)
| Shai Gilgeous-Alexander (6)
| Paycom Center14,672
| 13–18
|-  style="background:#cfc;"
| 32
| December 21
| Portland 
| 
| Shai Gilgeous-Alexander (27)
| Kenrich Williams (7)
|Josh Giddey (6)
| Paycom Center15,107
| 14–18
|-  style="background:#fcc;"
| 33
| December 23
| New Orleans 
| 
| Shai Gilgeous-Alexander (44)
| Giddey, Gilgeous-Alexander (10)
| Giddey, Gilgeous-Alexander (6)
| Paycom Center15,214
| 14–19
|-  style="background:#cfc;"
| 34
| December 27
| San Antonio
| 
| Shai Gilgeous-Alexander (28)
| Jalen Williams (9)
| Giddey, Gilgeous-Alexander (8)
| Paycom Center16,229
| 15–19
|-  style="background:#fcc;"
| 35
| December 29
| @ Charlotte 
| 
| Shai Gilgeous-Alexander (28)
| Giddey, Jay. Williams (10)
| Shai Gilgeous-Alexander (5)
| Spectrum Center19,425
| 15–20
|-  style="background:#fcc;"
| 36
| December 31
| Philadelphia 
| 
| Josh Giddey (20)
| Josh Giddey (9)
| Shai Gilgeous-Alexander (5)
| Paycom Center17,147
| 15–21

|-  style="background:#cfc;"
| 37
| January 3
| Boston
| 
| Josh Giddey (25)
| Jaylin Williams (7)
| Jalen Williams (6)
| Paycom Center16,778
| 16–21
|-  style="background:#fcc;"
| 38
| January 4
| @ Orlando 
| 
| Shai Gilgeous-Alexander (33)
| Kenrich Williams (9)
| Giddey, Gilgeous-Alexander, Mann, Jal. Williams (4)
| Amway Center18,925
| 16–22
|-  style="background:#cfc;"
| 39
| January 6
| Washington 
|  
| Shai Gilgeous-Alexander (30)
| Jalen Williams (8)
| Josh Giddey (9)
| Paycom Center14,790
| 17–22
|-  style="background:#cfc;"
| 40
| January 8
| Dallas 
|  
| Shai Gilgeous-Alexander (33)
| Kenrich Williams (9)
| Giddey, Gilgeous-Alexander, Wiggins (5)
| Paycom Center16,317
| 18–22
|-  style="background:#fcc;"
| 41
| January 10
| @ Miami
|  
| Shai Gilgeous-Alexander (26)
| Josh Giddey (15)
| Josh Giddey (10)
| FTX Arena19,600
| 18–23
|-  style="background:#cfc;"
| 42
| January 12 
| @ Philadelphia 
| 
| Shai Gilgeous-Alexander (37)
| Shai Gilgeous-Alexander (8)
| Josh Giddey (6)
| Wells Fargo Center20,892
| 19–23
|-  style="background:#cfc;"
| 43
| January 13
| @ Chicago 
| 
| Josh Giddey (25)
| Josh Giddey (10)
| Giddey, Gilgeous-Alexander (6) 
| United Center21,342
| 20–23
|-  style="background:#cfc;"
| 44
| January 15 
| @ Brooklyn
| 
| Giddey, Gilgeous-Alexander (28) 
| Josh Giddey (9)
| Josh Giddey (9)
| Barclays Center18,165
| 21–23
|-  style="background:#cfc;"
| 45
| January 18
| Indiana 
|  
| Gilgeous-Alexander, Joe (23)
| Luguentz Dort (11)
| Josh Giddey (11)
| Paycom Center14,748
| 22–23
|-  style="background:#fcc;"
| 46
| January 20
| @ Sacramento 
|  
| Shai Gilgeous-Alexander (37)
| Josh Giddey (10)
| Shai Gilgeous-Alexander (7)
| Golden 1 Center17,932
| 22–24
|-  style="background:#cfc;"
| 47
| January 22 
| @ Denver 
| 
| Shai Gilgeous-Alexander (34)
| Josh Giddey (9)
| Shai Gilgeous-Alexander (5)
| Ball Arena19,557
| 23–24
|-  style="background:#fcc;"
| 48
| January 25
| Atlanta
|  
| Shai Gilgeous-Alexander (36)
| Josh Giddey (8)
| Gilgeous-Alexander, K. Williams (8)
| Paycom Center15,079
| 23–25
|-  style="background:#cfc;"
| 49
| January 27
| Cleveland  
| 
| Shai Gilgeous-Alexander (35)
| Wiggins, K. Williams (7)
| Shai Gilgeous-Alexander (8)
| Paycom Center16,236
| 24–25
|-  style="background:#fcc;"
| 50
| January 30
| Golden State
| 
| Shai Gilgeous-Alexander (31)
| Giddey, K. Williams, Jay. Williams (8)
| Shai Gilgeous-Alexander (7)
| Paycom Center16,854
| 24–26

|-  style="background:#fcc;"
| 51
| February 1
| @ Houston
|  
| Shai Gilgeous-Alexander (24)
| Darius Bazley (9)
| Josh Giddey (8)
| Toyota Center15,181
| 24–27
|-  style="background:#cfc;"
| 52
| February 4
| Houston
|  
| Shai Gilgeous-Alexander (42)
| Josh Giddey (8)
| Josh Giddey (10)
| Paycom Center16,994
| 25–27
|-  style="background:#fcc;"
| 53
| February 6 
| @ Golden State
|  
| Shai Gilgeous-Alexander (20)
| Josh Giddey (7)
| Josh Giddey (8)
| Chase Center18,064
| 25–28
|-  style="background:#cfc;"
| 54
| February 7 
| @ L.A. Lakers
|  
| Shai Gilgeous-Alexander (30)
| Jal. Williams, Jay. Williams (7)
| Shai Gilgeous-Alexander (8)
| Crypto.com Arena18,997
| 26–28
|-  style="background:#cfc;"
| 55
| February 10 
| @ Portland 
|  
| Shai Gilgeous-Alexander (44)
| Josh Giddey (6)
| Giddey, Gilgeous-Alexander (7)
| Moda Center19,424
| 27–28
|-  style="background:#fcc;"
| 56
|February 13 
| New Orleans 
|  
| Shai Gilgeous-Alexander (24)
| Shai Gilgeous-Alexander (10)
| Shai Gilgeous-Alexander (5)
| Paycom Center14,920
| 27–29
|-  style="background:#cfc;"
| 57
| February 15
|Houston
|  
| Shai Gilgeous-Alexander (29)
| Jaylin Williams (16)
| Giddey, Gilgeous-Alexander (6)
| Paycom Center14,988
| 28–29
|- align="center"
|colspan="9" bgcolor="#bbcaff"|All-Star Break
|-  style="background:#fcc;"
| 58
| February 23
| @ Utah 
| 
| Shai Gilgeous-Alexander (39)
| Dort, Giddey (11)
| Shai Gilgeous-Alexander (7)
| Vivint Arena18,206
| 28–30
|-  style="background:#fcc;"
| 59
| February 24
| @ Phoenix 
| 
| Isaiah Joe (28)
| Luguentz Dort (10)
| Giddey, Jay. Williams (5)
| Footprint Center17,071
| 28–31
|-  style="background:#fcc;"
| 60
| February 26
|Sacramento
| 
| Isaiah Joe (24)
| Giddey, Waters III (7)
| Josh Giddey (5)
| Paycom Center15,147
| 28–32
|-  style="background:#fcc;"
| 61
| February 28
| Sacramento 
| 
| Jalen Williams (27)
| Dario Šarić (8)
| Jalen Williams (8)
| Paycom Center13,353
| 28–33

|-  style="background:#fcc;"
| 62
| March 1
| L.A. Lakers
| 
| Jalen Williams (24)
| Jaylin Williams (12)
| Josh Giddey (11)
| Paycom Center17,114
| 28–34
|-  style="background:#cfc;"
| 63
| March 3
| Utah 
| 
| Aaron Wiggins (27)
| Jaylin Williams (9)
| Josh Giddey (13)
| Paycom Center16,538
| 29–34
|-  style="background:#cfc;"
| 64
| March 5
| Utah 
|  
| Shai Gilgeous-Alexander (38)
| Josh Giddey (9)
| Josh Giddey (9)
| Paycom Center14,778
| 30–34
|-  style="background:#cfc;"
| 65
| March 7 
|Golden State
|  
| Shai Gilgeous-Alexander (33)
| Josh Giddey (11)
| Josh Giddey (17)
| Paycom Center16,142
| 31–34
|-  style="background:#fcc;"
| 66
| March 8
| @ Phoenix
|  
| Lindy Waters III (23)
| Dieng, Giddey, Robinson-Earl (7)
| Josh Giddey (5)
| Footprint Center17,071
| 31–35
|-  style="background:#cfc;"
| 67
| March 11
| @ New Orleans 
| 
| Shai Gilgeous-Alexander (35)
| Josh Giddey (7)
| Luguentz Dort (5)
| Smoothie King Center17,606
| 32–35
|-  style="background:#cfc;"
| 68
| March 12
| @ San Antonio
| 
| Jalen Williams (21)
| Josh Giddey (10)
| Jalen Williams (10)
| AT&T Center17,314
| 33–35
|-  style="background:#cfc;"
| 69
| March 14
|Brooklyn 
|  
| Shai Gilgeous-Alexander (35)
| Josh Giddey (13)
| Josh Giddey (10)
| Paycom Center16,976
| 34–35
|-  style="background:#fcc;"
| 70
| March 16
|@ Toronto
|  
| Shai Gilgeous-Alexander (29)
| Luguentz Dort (8)
| Luguentz Dort (5)
| Scotiabank Arena19,800
| 34–36
|-  style="background:#cfc;"
| 71
| March 19
|Phoenix 
|  
| Shai Gilgeous-Alexander (40)
| Jalen Williams (10)
| Josh Giddey (6)
| Paycom Center17,897
| 35–36
|-  style="background:#;"
| 72
| March 21
| @ LA Clippers
| | 
| 
| 
|
| Crypto.com Arena
| 
|-  style="background:#;"
| 73
| March 23
| @LA Clippers 
| | 
| 
| 
|
| Crypto.com Arena
| 
|-  style="background:#;"
| 74
| March 24
| @LA Lakers
| | 
| 
| 
|
| Crypto.com Arena
| 
|-  style="background:#;"
| 75
| March 26 
|@ Portland
| | 
| 
| 
|
| Moda Center
| 
|-  style="background:#;"
| 76
| March 28 
| Charlotte 
| | 
| 
| 
|
| Paycom Center
|
|-  style="background:#;"
| 77
| March 29 
|Detroit 
| | 
| 
| 
|
| Paycom Center
| 
|-  style="background:#;"
| 78
|March 31
| @ Indiana 
| | 
| 
| 
|
| Gainbridge Fieldhouse
| 

|-  style="background:#;"
| 79
| April 2
|Phoenix 
| | 
| 
| 
|
| Paycom Center
| 
|-  style="background:#;"
| 80
| April 4 
| @Golden State 
| | 
| 
| 
|
| Paycom Center
| 
|-  style="background:#;"
| 81
| April 6
| @Utah 
| | 
| 
| 
|
| Vivint Arena
| 
|-  style="background:#;"
| 82
| April 9
|Memphis
| | 
| 
| 
|
| Paycom Center
|

Record vs. opponents

Player statistics

Preseason

 Led team in statistic
Source: RealGM
T Waived after preseason

Regular season

 Led team in statistic
Source: Basketball-Reference
‡ Waived during the season
† Traded during the season
≠ Acquired during the season

Source: RealGM

Individual game highs

Awards and records

Awards

Records
In Shai Gilgeous-Alexander's first seven appearances this season, Gilgeous-Alexander scored 226 points marking the highest point total in Thunder history by a player through his first seven games of a season.
On November 11, 2022, eight Thunder players scored in double-figures for the first time in Thunder history in a 132-113 win over the Toronto Raptors.
On November 13, 2022, Josh Giddey joined Wilt Chamberlain as the only other player in NBA history to record triple-doubles during their first two games at Madison Square Garden against the New York Knicks. Giddey had 24 points, 10 rebounds, and 12 assists in his second game at Madison Square Garden.
On December 27, 2022, the Thunder bench recorded 68 points marking the second most bench points in Thunder history.
On December 27, 2022, Josh Giddey became the second-youngest NBA player to reach 1,000 points, 500 rebounds and 500 assists, behind only LeBron James.
On January 3, 2023, the Thunder recorded a then franchise-high 150 points in Oklahoma City history as well as a franchise-high 48 points in a quarter. 150 is also tied for the second-highest total the Boston Celtics have allowed in franchise history.
On January 3, 2023, the Thunder had five players score 20 or more points in a game for the second time in franchise history.
On January 18, 2023, the Thunder recorded a franchise-high 41 assists against the Indiana Pacers in a 126-106 win. Josh Giddey had 11 assists and Kenrich Williams had a career high 10 assists.
On February 4, 2023, the Thunder recorded a franchise-high 153 points against the Houston Rockets in a 153-121 win. Shai Gilgeous-Alexander scored 42 points to lead all scorers. The Thunder had six players in double figures scoring.

Milestones
On November 13, 2022, Shai Gilgeous-Alexander passed Paul George on the Thunder's all-time scoring list.
On December 1, 2022, Jalen Williams joined Russell Westbrook and Josh Giddey to earn Rookie of the Month honors since the franchise moved to Oklahoma City.
On December 16, 2022, Luguentz Dort passed James Harden on the Thunder's all-time most three-pointers.
Josh Giddey and Jalen Williams became the 12th and 13th Thunder player to be named a Rising Star.
Shai Gilgeous-Alexander joins Kevin Durant, Russell Westbrook, Paul George, and Chris Paul as the fifth Thunder player to be named an All-Star since the franchise moved to Oklahoma City.

Injuries

G League assignments

Source: NBA G League Transactions

Transactions

Overview

Trades

Free agency

Re-signed

Additions

Subtractions

G League

The Oklahoma City Blue started their 9th season of the franchise in Oklahoma City and their 22nd season in the NBA G League. Last season, the Blue finished 15-20 and failed to make the playoffs after becoming the runner-ups in the 2021 Winter Showcase.

On September 23, 2022, the Thunder named Kameron Woods the new head coach of the Blue, becoming the third head coach since the franchise relocated from Tulsa. Woods replaced Grant Gibbs following his promotion to the Thunder. Gibbs joins current head coach Mark Daigneault and Darko Rajaković as the third Blue head coach to join the Thunder coaching staff.

To fill in the open two-way spot left by Melvin Frazier Jr., the Thunder signed Eugene Omoruyi to a two-way contract. Omoruyi joined Lindy Waters III on a two-way after spending part of the 2021-22 season with the Dallas Mavericks.  On February 10, the Thunder converted Omoruyi's contract into a standard, becoming the fifth Thunder player to have their two-way converted. To replace Omoruyi, the Thunder signed Olivier Sarr who spent part of the last season with the Thunder. After waiving Omoruyi sixteen days after re-signing to a standard, the Thunder converted Lindy Waters III into a standard. Replacing Waters III was Jared Butler who began the season with the Grand Rapids Gold.

Throughout the season, the Thunder sent down Ousmane Dieng, Tre Mann, Aleksej Pokuševski, Jeremiah Robinson-Earl, Lindy Waters III, Aaron Wiggins, and Jaylin Williams on G League assignments. On February 1, 2023, the Blue acquired André Roberson after it was reported that Roberson had been practicing with the Blue last month. Roberson spent seven seasons with the Thunder and became one of the top defenders in the league including an All-Defensive team in 2017. During the 2017-18 season, Roberson suffered a patellar tendon and was sidelined for the remainder of the season and the following season. Roberson's last stint was with the Brooklyn Nets during the 2020-21 season.

References

2022–23
Oklahoma City Thunder
Oklahoma City Thunder
Oklahoma City Thunder